Matthew David Barrett   (born 1974) is a West Australian botanist. He has published some 70 botanical names.  See also Taxa named by Matthew David Barrett. He worked at Kings Park and Botanic Garden and is currently (July 2020) employed by the University of Western Australia.

Some publications

References

Living people
1974 births
21st-century Australian botanists